Voices in My Head or Voice in My Head may refer to:

Voices in My Head (album), a 2013 album by Dot Rotten
Voice in My Head, a 2005 album by Leo Sayer
Voices in My Head (EP), by Riverside, 2005
"Voices in My Head" (Ashley Tisdale song), 2018
Voices in My Head (Falling in Reverse song), 2022
"Voices in My Head", a song by Bob Mould from the 2016 album Patch the Sky
"Voice in My Head", a song by Amy Lee from the 2014 soundtrack Aftermath
"Voice in My Head", a song by Alessia Cara from her 2021 album In the Meantime
"Voices in My Head", the finale of the musical Be More Chill
The Voice in My Head, a stand-up comedy act by Christopher Titus
Voices in My Head, a 2006 documentary by David Malone

See also

Auditory hallucination, a form of hallucination that involves perceiving sounds without auditory stimulus
Soundtrack for the Voices in My Head (disambiguation)